Ever Changing Times is the fifth studio album by Steve Lukather. It was his first album since leaving Toto. In March 2008, a site was launched in order to promote the album. According to Lukather, the album shows a lot of his influences and music he likes.

Track listing
"Ever Changing Times" (Steve Lukather, Randy Goodrum) - 5:29
"The Letting Go" (Steve Lukather, Randy Goodrum) - 5:52
"New World" (Steve Lukather, Trevor Lukather, Randy Goodrum) - 4:32
"Tell Me What You Want from Me" (Steve Lukather, Trevor Lukather, Phil Soussan) - 5:13
"I Am" (Steve Lukather, Randy Goodrum) - 3:15
"Jammin' with Jesus" (John Sloman administered by Steve Lukather) - 5:55
"Stab in the Back" (Steve Lukather, Randy Goodrum) - 5:59
"Never Ending Nights" (Steve Lukather, Randy Goodrum) - 5:35
"Ice Bound" (Steve Lukather, Randy Goodrum) - 4:19
"How Many Zeros" (Steve Lukather, Jeff Babko, Stan Lynch) - 4:33
"The Truth" (Steve Lukather featuring Steve Porcaro) - 3:50
Bonus DVD (Japan only):
Everchanging Times (Music Video)
Everchanging Times (Document)

Personnel 
 Steve Lukather – vocals (1-10), guitars (1-10), guitar solo (11)
 Trevor Lukather – guitars (3), backing vocals (3, 6), guitar riffs (4)
 Jeff Babko – keyboards (1-6, 8–10), synthesizers (2, 4-7), Rhodes piano (7)
 Randy Goodrum – synthesizers (1, 2, 5, 10), backing vocals (5)
 Jyro Xhan – synthesizers (1), atmospheric sounds (1)
 Steve MacMillan – additional synthesizers (1, 3, 5, 9)
 Greg Mathieson – Hammond organ (6, 7)
 Steve Weingart – synthesizer fills (7), synth solo (9)
 Olle Romo – synthesizers (8)
 Steve Porcaro – keyboards (11), orchestration (11), arrangements (11)
 John Pierce – bass (1)
 Leland Sklar – bass (2, 3, 5-10)
 Phil Soussan – bass (4), backing vocals (4)
 Abe Laboriel Jr. – drums (1-10)
 Lenny Castro – percussion (2, 6-10)
 Joseph Williams – backing vocals (1, 3, 6, 8, 9)
 Bernard Fowler – backing vocals (3, 6)
 Bill Champlin – backing vocals (6, 10)
 Sharolette Gibson – backing vocals (6)
 Tina Lukather – backing vocals (7), ooh's and laughter (7)

Production 
 Steve Lukather – producer 
 Steve MacMillan – producer, recording, mixing 
 Randy Goodrum – executive producer 
 John Silas Cranfield – assistant engineer 
 Ken Eisennagel – assistant engineer 
 Stephen Marcussen – mastering
 Naoki Nomura – A&R
 Micky Suzuki – A&R 
 Rhoda Neal – album coordinator 
 Amy McGuire Lynch – album coordinator 
 Ricky Rodriguez – creative direction
 Satoshi Hasegawa – CD artwork
 Maryanne Bilham-Knight – photography 
 Robert Knight – photography
 Sonny Abelardo – management
 Mixed at MacMan Digital
 Mastered at Marcussen Mastering (Hollywood, California).

References

External links
Album information
Promotion site for Ever Changing Times
http://www.stevelukather.com/news-articles/2008/06/reggie-boyle-ect-tour-rehearsal-and-band-introduction.aspx

2008 albums
Steve Lukather albums
Frontiers Records albums